James Robinson House may refer to:

Robinson House (Manassas, Virginia), built by and for a James Robinson, part of the Manassas National Battlefield Park
James Robinson House (Mitchellsburg, Kentucky), a National Register of Historic Places listing in Boyle County, Kentucky
James E. Robinson House, a National Register of Historic Places listing in Beaver County, Utah

See also
Robinson House (disambiguation)